Keystone Bop: Sunday Night is a live album by jazz trumpeter Freddie Hubbard, featuring tenor saxophonist Joe Henderson and vibraphonist Bobby Hutcherson. Recorded on Sunday, November 29th, 1981 and released in this form by the Prestige label in 1994. The Allmusic review by Scott Yanow states "Hubbard fans can be assured that this set finds him in excellent form on a good night".

Track listing
All compositions by Freddie Hubbard except as indicated
 "Birdlike" - 14:12
 "The Littlest One of All" (Bobby Hutcherson) -  9:14
 "The Intrepid Fox" - 14:05
 "Sky Dive" - 16:42
 "Body and Soul" (Frank Eyton, Johnny Green, Edward Heyman, Robert Sour) - 10:44
Recorded at Keystone Korner, San Francisco, California on November 29, 1981

Personnel
Freddie Hubbard - trumpet
Joe Henderson - tenor saxophone
Bobby Hutcherson - vibraphone
Billy Childs - piano
Larry Klein - double bass
Steve Houghton - drums

References

Bobby Hutcherson live albums
Joe Henderson live albums
1982 live albums
Freddie Hubbard live albums
Prestige Records live albums
Albums recorded at Keystone Korner